Edward George Atkinson (22 September 1920 – 8 June 2016) was an Australian rules footballer who played with North Melbourne in the Victorian Football League (VFL).

Personal life
Anderson served as a corporal in the Australian Army during the Second World War.

Notes

External links 

1920 births
Military personnel from Melbourne
North Melbourne Football Club players
Northcote Football Club players
2016 deaths
Australian rules footballers from Melbourne
Australian Army soldiers
Australian Army personnel of World War II